Thank you . 

The first TikTok Awards Night ceremony was first held in Mauritius on 23 December 2019 by Radio Plus (Mauritius), at the Caudan Arts Centre in Port Louis, honoring different tiktokers in different categories and encouraging them for their effort of providing entertainment through their videos on the TikTok social app.

TikTok Awards Night Winners 2019

References 

Awards established in 2019
Mauritian awards
TikTok
2019 establishments in Africa